Aleksandra Semibratova (born 10 December 2004 in Surgut, Russia) is a Russian group rhythmic gymnast. She is the 2019 World Junior Group All-Around, Team, 5 Hoops and 5 Ribbons champion and the 2019 European Junior Group All-Around, Team, 5 Hoops and 5 Ribbons champion.

Career

Junior 
Aleksandra was born in Surgut on 10 December 2004. She began training in rhythmic gymnastics at age 5. In 2017, she moved to Moscow and began training at the Olympic Reserve School. After participating in a number of training camps and gaining experience, the gymnast performed at the "Hopes of Russia" tournament. She was recognized by Irina Viner, head coach of Russian national team, who invited her to train with junior national team. She was a member of Russian Group that competed at the 2019 World Junior Championships in Moscow, Russia taking the gold medal scoring a total of (49.550) ahead of Italy (45.100) and Belarus (43.100) in the all-around competition. They also won gold medals in team competition and in both apparatus finals.

Senior 
In 2020, Sasha was added to Russian National Reserve Team as a senior group gymnast. Reserve group took part in Grand Prix Tartu in February. Sasha and her teammates placed second in Group All-Around competition after Uzbekistan and took gold medals in both Apparatus Finals. In October, Russian Federation organized 2nd Online Tournament in rhythmic gymnastics, where reserve group won in Group All-Around competition (69.050) in front of Uzbekistan.

References

External links 
 

Russian rhythmic gymnasts
2004 births
Living people
Sportspeople from Surgut
Medalists at the Junior World Rhythmic Gymnastics Championships